Jane Vongvorachoti (born 7 January 1984) is a Thai long-distance runner.

Vongvorachoti studied in the United States and has a degree in health administration from Columbia University. In 2014, she was named New York Road Runners' Runner of the Year for her age group.  She won a bronze medal in the 10,000 metres at the 2015 Southeast Asian Games. She placed 91st in the 2016 Olympic marathon.

References

1984 births
Living people
Jane Vongvorachoti
Jane Vongvorachoti
Athletes (track and field) at the 2016 Summer Olympics
Athletes (track and field) at the 2018 Asian Games
Southeast Asian Games medalists in athletics
Jane Vongvorachoti
Competitors at the 2015 Southeast Asian Games
Jane Vongvorachoti
Jane Vongvorachoti